Rinorea hirsuta is a species of plant in the Violaceae family. It is found in Colombia and Panama.

References

hirsuta
Near threatened plants
Taxonomy articles created by Polbot
Plants described in 1983